Iran men's national hockey team may refer to:
Iran men's national field hockey team
Iran men's national ice hockey team
Iran men's national inline hockey team